Jessica Favre (born 2 May 1995) is a Swiss diver. She competed in the women's 3 metre springboard event at the 2019 World Aquatics Championships. She finished in 20th place in the preliminary round.

References

1995 births
Living people
Swiss female divers
Place of birth missing (living people)